Königsplatz (German, 'King's Square') may refer to the following places in Germany:

 Königsplatz, Munich
Königsplatz (Munich U-Bahn)
 Königsplatz, Berlin, now known as Platz der Republik

See also
King's Square (disambiguation)